David French may refer to:
 David H. French (anthropologist) (1918–1994), American anthropologist and linguist
 David H. French (archaeologist) (1933 – 2017), British archaeologist
 David French (playwright) (1939–2010), Canadian writer for stage and television
 David French (political commentator) (born 1969), American lawyer and political writer
 David French (politician), member of the Kansas House of Representatives

See also
 David French Boyd (1834–1899), American academic and Civil War veteran; first president of Louisiana State University
 French (surname)